Simon Hix is a British political scientist, holder of the Stein Rokkan chair in comparative politics at the European University Institute in Florence. He was also Harold Laski Professor of Political Science and pro-director for research at the London School of Economics and Political Science. Hix is an expert in European Union politics, and the author of several books, including What's Wrong with the European Union and How to Fix It, Democratic Politics in the European Parliament with Abdul Noury and Gérard Roland, and The Political System of the European Union. He is also associate editor of the international peer-reviewed European Union Politics, and founder and chairman of VoteWatch Europe, an influential online EU affairs think-tank founded in London in 2009 that combines big data with political insight. After a first degree and a master's from the London School of Economics and Political Science, Simon Hix obtained a PhD in Political and Social Science at the European University Institute in Florence in 1995, and lectured in European Politics at Brunel University 1996–97, before joining the LSE in 1997. In this university he was promoted to professor in 2004, and served also as head of its department of government (2012–2015), academic director of its school of public policy (2017–2019), and pro-director for research from 2019. He finally was appointed Stein Rokkan chair of comparative politics at the European University Institute in Florence in 2021. His main areas of research are voting in parliaments, democratic institutions, and EU politics.

Distinctions
Simon Hix was elected a Fellow of the British Academy in 2011. In 2015 he was named the inaugural Harold Laski Chair at the London School of Economics and Political Science. Later that year he was awarded a degree of Doctor Honoris Causa by the National School of Political and Administrative Studies in Bucharest. In 2021 he was appointed Stein Rokkan Chair in comparative politics at the European University Institute.

Publications
Political Parties in the European Union (1997), with Christopher Lord, London: Macmillan.
The Political System of the European Union (1999), London: Palgrave.
Götz, Klaus H.; Hix, Simon, eds. (2001). Europeanised Politics? : European Integration and National Political Systems. Frank Cass. . .
Hix, Simon; Raunio, Tapio; Scully, Roger (2003). "Fifty Years on: Research on the European Parliament". JCMS: Journal of Common Market Studies. Blackwell Science Ltd. 41 (2): 191–202. . ISSN 0021-9886 – via John Wiley & Sons, Ltd.
Hix, Simon; Høyland, Bjørn (2005). The Political System of the European Union. The European Union Series (2nd ed.). Palgrave Macmillan. . .
Hix, Simon; Noury, Abdul G.; Gérard, Roland (2007). Democratic Politics in the European Parliament. Cambridge University Press. . .
Hix, Simon (2013) [First published in 2008]. What's Wrong with the European Union and How to Fix It. John Wiley & Sons. . .
Hix, Simon; Høyland, Bjørn (2011). The Political System of the European Union. The European Union Series (3rd ed.). Palgrave Macmillan. . .

References

Academics of the London School of Economics
Fellows of the British Academy
Living people
British political scientists
Place of birth missing (living people)
European Union and European integration scholars
European University Institute alumni
Academic staff of the European University Institute
Alumni of the London School of Economics
1968 births